Chandler is a town in the Gaspésie–Îles-de-la-Madeleine region of Quebec, Canada. It is the second-most populous town on the Gaspé Peninsula after the Town of Gaspé. It was known as Pabos between June 27, 2001 and May 4, 2002.

The city is the birthplace of NHL player Mathieu Garon, Quebec politician Joseph-Léonard Duguay, singer "La Bolduc" (Mary Rose Anna Travers), singer and actor Flora Gionest-Roussy and world curling champion John Kawaja. Chandler's major industries include fishing and tourism.

In addition to Chandler itself, the town's territory also includes the communities of Newport, Grand-Pabos-Ouest, Pabos, Pabos Mills, and Saint-François-de-Pabos.

History

The area was first settled in 1729, making it one of the oldest places on the Gaspé coast. It was known over time as Paboc, Pabo, Pabok, Pabeau, and Pas-bos. In 1815, the final spelling of Pabos was assigned in the Description topographique de la province du Bas Canada (Topographical Description of the Province of Lower Canada). The meaning of this name is uncertain, although there are various theories: from the Mi'kmaq word papôg (meaning "playful waters"); a Basque name; from the Spanish pavo; a place in France, home of the first seignoral lord; or from the French words pas[sage] beau (meaning "beautiful passage").

In 1758, the settlement was destroyed by General James Wolfe during his Gulf of St. Lawrence Campaign. It was rebuilt and by 1860, the Parish of Sainte-Adélaïde-de-Pabos was formed. In 1876, it had become the most important civil and religious town in the Gaspésie region, and the place was incorporated as the Municipality of Pabos. 3 years later, its post office opened.

In 1912, Percy Milton Chandler, a Philadelphian manufacturer, built the first pulp and paper mill in the Gaspésie at the mouth of the Grand Pabos River, originally known as Portage-du-Grand-Pabos. By 1916, this village separated from Pabos and was incorporated as the Village Municipality of Chandler. The name Grand-Pabos was also used and in the 1930s, it was even tried to officially rename the village to Grand-Pabos. In 1958, Chandler gained ville (city) status.

On June 27, 2001, the municipalities of Newport, Pabos, Pabos Mills, and Saint-François-de-Pabos, as well as the City of Chandler, were merged to form the new City of Pabos, renamed to Chandler on May 4, 2002.

Demographics 

Attractions
Saint Dominique's Church is a large Roman Catholic church in Newport.

Local government
List of former mayors (since formation of current municipality):
 Claude Cyr (2001–2009)
 Louisette Langlois (2009–2021)
 Gilles Daraiche (2021–present)

See also
List of cities in Quebec

References

External links

Chandler's Transport Canada page
Municipalities and cities of Gaspé region

Cities and towns in Quebec
Incorporated places in Gaspésie–Îles-de-la-Madeleine